The vulva (plural: vulvas or vulvae; derived from Latin for wrapper or covering) consists of the external female sex organs. The vulva includes the mons pubis (or mons veneris), labia majora, labia minora, clitoris, vestibular bulbs, vulval vestibule, urinary meatus, the vaginal opening, hymen, and Bartholin's and Skene's vestibular glands. The urinary meatus is also included as it opens into the vulval vestibule. Other features of the vulva include the pudendal cleft, sebaceous glands, the urogenital triangle (anterior part of the perineum), and pubic hair. The vulva includes the entrance to the vagina, which leads to the uterus, and provides a double layer of protection for this by the folds of the outer and inner labia. Pelvic floor muscles support the structures of the vulva. Other muscles of the urogenital triangle also give support.

Blood supply to the vulva comes from the three pudendal arteries. The internal pudendal veins give drainage. Afferent lymph vessels carry lymph away from the vulva to the inguinal lymph nodes. The nerves that supply the vulva are the pudendal nerve, perineal nerve, ilioinguinal nerve and their branches. Blood and nerve supply to the vulva contribute to the stages of sexual arousal that are helpful in the reproduction process.

Following the development of the vulva, changes take place at birth, childhood, puberty, menopause and post-menopause. There is a great deal of variation in the appearance of the vulva, particularly in relation to the labia minora. The vulva can be affected by many disorders which may often result in irritation. Vulvovaginal health measures can prevent many of these. Other disorders include a number of infections and cancers. There are several vulval restorative surgeries known as genitoplasties, and some of these are also used as cosmetic surgery procedures.

Different cultures have held different views of the vulva. Some ancient religions and societies have worshipped the vulva and revered the female as a goddess. Major traditions in Hinduism continue this. There has been an artistic reaction to this in various attempts to bring about a more positive and natural outlook, such as work from British, American, and Japanese artists. While the vagina is a separate part of the anatomy, it has often been used synonymously with vulva.

Structure

The main structures of the vulva are: the mons pubis, the labia majora and labia minora, the external parts of the clitoris – the clitoral hood and the glans, the urinary meatus, the vaginal opening and hymen, and Bartholin's and Skene's vestibular glands. Other features include the pudendal cleft, pubic hair, sebaceous glands, the vulval vestibule, and the urogenital triangle.

Mons pubis

The mons pubis is the soft mound of fatty tissue at the front of the vulva, in the pubic region covering the pubic bone.  is Latin for "pubic mound" and is present in both sexes to act as a cushion during sexual intercourse, and is more pronounced in the female. The variant term mons veneris ('mound of Venus') is used specifically for females. The lower part of the mons pubis is divided by a fissure – the pudendal cleft – which separates the mons pubis into the labia majora. After puberty, the clitoral hood and the labia minora can protrude into the pudendal cleft in a variable degree. The mons and labia majora become covered in pubic hair at puberty.

Labia
The labia majora and the labia minora cover the vulval vestibule. The outer pair of folds, divided by the pudendal cleft, are the labia majora (New Latin for "larger lips"). They contain and protect the other structures of the vulva. The labia majora meet at the front at the mons pubis, and meet posteriorly at the urogenital triangle (the anterior part of the perineum) between the pudendal cleft and the anus. The labia minora are often pink or brownish black, relevant to the person's skin color.

The grooves between the labia majora and labia minora are called the interlabial sulci, or interlabial folds. The labia minora (smaller lips) are the inner two soft folds, within the labia majora. They have more color than the labia majora and contain numerous sebaceous glands. They meet posteriorly at the frenulum of the labia minora, a fold of restrictive tissue. The labia minora meet again at the front of the vulva to form the clitoral hood, also known as the prepuce.

The visible portion of the clitoris is the clitoral glans. Typically, this is roughly the size and shape of a pea, and can vary in size from about 6 mm to 25 mm. The size can also vary when it is erect. The clitoral glans contains as many nerve endings as the much larger homologous glans penis in the male, which makes it highly sensitive. The only known function of the clitoris is to focus sexual feelings. The clitoral hood is a protective fold of skin which varies in shape and size, and it may partially or completely cover the clitoris. The clitoris is the homologue of the penis, and the clitoral hood is the female equivalent of the male foreskin, and may be partially or completely hidden within the pudendal cleft.

Vestibule
The area between the labia minora where the vaginal opening and the urinary meatus are located is called the vulval vestibule, or vestibule of the vagina. The urinary meatus is below the clitoris and just in front of the vaginal opening which is near to the perineum. The term introitus is more technically correct than "opening", since the vagina is usually collapsed, with the opening closed. The introitus is sometimes partly covered by a membrane called the hymen. The hymen will usually rupture during the first episode of vigorous sex, and the blood produced by this rupture has been seen to signify virginity. However, the hymen may also rupture spontaneously during exercise or be stretched by normal activities such as the use of tampons and menstrual cups, or be so minor as to be unnoticeable, or be absent. In some rare cases, the hymen may completely cover the vaginal opening, requiring a surgical procedure called a hymenotomy. On either side of the back part of the vaginal opening are the two greater vestibular glands known as Bartholin's glands. These glands secrete mucus and a vaginal and vulval lubricant. They are homologous to the bulbourethral glands in the male. The lesser vestibular glands known as Skene's glands, are found on the anterior wall of the vagina. They are homologues of the male prostate gland and are also referred to as the female prostate.

Muscles
Pelvic floor muscles help to support the vulvar structures. The voluntary, pubococcygeus muscle, part of the levator ani muscle partially constricts the vaginal opening. Other muscles of the urogenital triangle support the vulvar area and they include the transverse perineal muscles, the bulbospongiosus, and the ischiocavernosus muscles. The bulbospongiosus muscle decreases the vaginal opening. Their contractions play a role in the vaginal contractions of orgasm by causing the vestibular bulbs to contract.

Blood, lymph and nerve supply
The tissues of the vulva are highly vascularised and blood supply is provided by the three pudendal arteries. Venous return is via the external and internal pudendal veins.
The organs and tissues of the vulva are drained by a chain of superficial inguinal lymph nodes located along the blood vessels.

The ilioinguinal nerve originates from the first lumbar nerve and gives branches that include the anterior labial nerves which supply the skin of the mons pubis and the labia majora. The perineal nerve is one of the terminal branches of the pudendal nerve and this branches into the posterior labial nerves to supply the labia. The pudendal nerve branches include the dorsal nerve of clitoris which gives sensation to the clitoris. The clitoral glans is seen to be populated by a large number of small nerves, a number that decreases as the tissue changes towards the urethra. The density of nerves at the glans indicates that it is the center of heightened sensation. Cavernous nerves from the uterovaginal plexus supply the erectile tissue of the clitoris. These are joined underneath the pubic arch by the dorsal nerve of the clitoris.
The pudendal nerve enters the pelvis through the lesser sciatic foramen and continues medial to the internal pudendal artery. The point where the nerve circles the ischial spine is the location where a pudendal block of local anesthetic can be administered to inhibit sensation to the vulva. A number of smaller nerves split off from the pudendal nerve. The deep branch of the perineal nerve supplies the muscles of the perineum and a branch of this supplies the bulb of the vestibule.

Variations

There is a great deal of variation in the appearance of female genitals. Much of this variation lies in the significant differences in the size, shape, and color of the labia minora. Though called the smaller lips they can often be of considerable size and may protrude outside the vagina or labia majora. This variation has also been evidenced in a large display of 400 vulval casts called the Great Wall of Vagina created by Jamie McCartney to fill the lack of information of what a normal vulva looks like. The casts taken from a large and varied group of women showed clearly that there is much variation. Pubic hair also varies in its color, texture, and amount of curl.

Researchers from the Elizabeth Garret Anderson Hospital, London, measured multiple genital dimensions of 50 women between the ages of 18 and 50, with a mean age of 35.6:

Development

Prenatal development

In week three of the development of the embryo, mesenchyme cells from the primitive streak migrate around the cloacal membrane. Early in the fifth week the cells form two swellings called the cloacal folds. The cloacal folds meet in front of the cloacal membrane and form a raised area known as the genital tubercle. The urorectal septum fuses with the cloacal membrane to form the perineum. This division creates two areas one surrounded by the urethral folds and the other by the anal folds. These areas become the urogenital triangle and the anal triangle. The area between the vagina and the anus is known as the clinical perineum.

At the same time a pair of swellings on either side of the urethral folds known as the genital swellings develop into the labioscrotal swellings. Sexual differentiation takes place, and at the end of week 6 in the female, hormones stimulate further development and the genital tubercle bends and forms the clitoris. The urethral folds form the labia minora and the labioscrotal swellings form the labia majora. At this time the sexes still cannot be distinguished. The appearance of the external genitalia is similar in male and female embryos until the twelfth week and even then is difficult to distinguish.

The uterovaginal canal or genital canal, forms in the third month of the development of the urogenital system. The lower part of the canal is blocked off by a plate of tissue, the vaginal plate. This tissue develops and lengthens during the third to fifth months and the lower part of the vaginal canal is formed by a process of desquamation or cell shedding. The end of the vaginal canal is blocked off by an endodermal membrane which separates the opening from the vestibule. In the fifth month the membrane degenerates but leaves a remnant called the hymen.

Organs in the male and female with a shared common ancestry are said to be homologous. The clitoral glans is homologous to the male glans penis, and the clitoral body and the clitoral crura are homologous to the corpora cavernosa of the penis. The labia majora is homologous to the scrotum; the clitoral hood is homologous to the foreskin, and the labia minora is homologous to the spongy urethra. The vestibular bulbs beneath the skin of the labia minora are homologous to the corpus spongiosum, the tissue of the penis surrounding the urethra, and to the bulb of the penis. Bartholin's glands are homologous to the bulbourethral glands in males.

Childhood
The newborn's vulva may be swollen or enlarged as a result of having been exposed, via the placenta, to her mother's increased levels of hormones. The labia majora are closed. These changes disappear over the first few months. During childhood before puberty, the lack of estrogen can cause the labia to become sticky and to ultimately join firmly together. This condition is known as labial fusion and is rarely found after puberty when oestrogen production has increased.

Puberty
Puberty is the onset of the ability to reproduce, and takes place over two to three years, producing a number of changes. The structures of the vulva become proportionately larger and may become more pronounced. Pubarche, the first appearance of pubic hair develops, firstly on the labia majora, and later spreads to the mons pubis, and sometimes to the inner thighs and perineum. Pubic hair is much coarser than other body hair, and is considered a secondary sex characteristic. Pubarche can occur independently of puberty. Premature pubarche may sometimes indicate a later metabolic-endocrine disorder seen at adolescence. The disorder sometimes known as a polyendocrine disorder is marked by elevated levels of androgen, insulin, and lipids, and may originate in the fetus. Instead of being seen as a normal variant it is proposed that premature pubarche may be seen as a marker for these later endocrine disorders.

Apocrine sweat glands secrete sweat into the pubic hair follicles. This is broken down by bacteria on the skin and produces an odor, which some consider to act as an attractant sex pheromone. The labia minora may grow more prominent and undergo changes in color. At puberty the first monthly period known as menarche marks the onset of menstruation.
In prepubertal girls the skin of the vulva is thin and delicate, and its neutral pH makes it prone to irritation. The production of the female sex hormone estradiol (an estrogen) at puberty, causes the perineal skin to thicken by keratinising, and this reduces the risk of infection. Estrogen also causes the laying down of fat in the development of the secondary sex characteristics. This contributes to the maturation of the vulva with increases in the size of the mons pubis, and the labia majora and the enlargement of the labia minora.

Pregnancy
In pregnancy the vulva and vagina take on a bluish colouring due to venous congestion. This appears between the eighth and twelfth week and continues to darken as the pregnancy continues. Estrogen is produced in large quantities during pregnancy and this causes the external genitals to become enlarged. The vaginal opening and the vagina are also enlarged. After childbirth a vaginal discharge known as lochia is produced and continues for about ten days.

Menopause
During menopause, hormone levels decrease, which causes changes in the vulva known as vulvovaginal atrophy. The decreased estrogen affects the mons, the labia, and the vaginal opening and can cause pale, itchy, and sore skin. Other visible changes are a thinning of the pubic hair, a loss of fat from the labia majora, a thinning of the labia minora, and a narrowing of the vaginal opening. This condition has been renamed by some bodies as the genitourinary syndrome of menopause as a more comprehensive term.

Function and physiology

The vulva has a major role to play in the reproductive system. It provides entry to, and protection for the uterus, and the right conditions in terms of warmth and moisture that aids in its sexual and reproductive functions. The external organs of the vulva are richly innervated and provide pleasure when properly stimulated. The mons pubis provides cushioning against the pubic bone during intercourse.

A number of different secretions are associated with the vulva, including urine (from the urethral opening), sweat (from the apocrine glands), menses (leaving from the vagina), sebum (from the sebaceous glands), alkaline fluid (from the Bartholin's glands), mucus (from the Skene's glands), vaginal lubrication from the vaginal wall and smegma. Smegma is a white substance formed from a combination of dead cells, skin oils, moisture and naturally occurring bacteria, that forms in the genitalia. In females this thickened secretion collects around the clitoris and labial folds. It can cause discomfort during sexual activity as it can cause the clitoral glans to stick to the hood, and is easily removed by bathing. Aliphatic acids known as copulins are also secreted in the vagina. These are believed to act as pheromones. Their fatty acid composition, and consequently their odor changes in relation to the stages of the menstrual cycle.

Sexual arousal

The clitoris and the labia minora are both erogenous areas in the vulva. Local stimulation can involve the clitoris, vagina and other perineal regions. The clitoris is the human female's most sensitive erogenous zone and generally the primary anatomical source of human female sexual pleasure. Sexual stimulation of the clitoris (by a number of means) can result in widespread sexual arousal and, if maintained, can result in orgasm. Stimulation to orgasm is optimally achieved by a massaging sensation.

Sexual arousal results in a number of physical changes in the vulva. During arousal vaginal lubrication increases. Vulva tissue is highly vascularised; arterioles dilate in response to sexual arousal and the smaller veins will compress after arousal, so that the clitoris and labia minora increase in size. Increased vasocongestion in the vagina causes it to swell, decreasing the size of the vaginal opening by about 30%. The clitoris becomes increasingly erect, and the glans moves towards the pubic bone, becoming concealed by the hood. The labia minora increase considerably in thickness. The labia minora sometimes change considerably in color, going from pink to red in lighter skinned women who have not borne a child, or red to dark red in those that have. Immediately prior to an orgasm, the clitoris becomes exceptionally engorged, causing the glans to appear to retract into the clitoral hood. Rhythmic muscle contractions occur in the outer third of the vagina, as well as the uterus and anus. Contractions become less intense and more randomly spaced as the orgasm continues. The number of contractions that accompany an orgasm vary depending on its intensity. An orgasm may be accompanied by female ejaculation, causing liquid from either the Skene's gland or bladder to be expelled through the urethra. The pooled blood begins to dissipate, although at a much slower rate if an orgasm has not occurred. The vagina and vaginal opening return to their normal relaxed state, and the rest of the vulva returns to its normal size, position and color.

Distance between vagina and clitoral glans 
The distance of the frenula clitoridis at the clitoral glans from the urinary meatus located in the vaginal opening, the so-called CUMD (clitoral-urinary meatus distance), is measured. In the 1920s, Marie Bonaparte conducted surveys among women to find out whether they get an orgasm during coitus. The causes of lack of sexual arousal were known to be aversion or psychological inhibitions. Among the test subjects, there were women who, with a man they loved and desired, "felt the greatest pleasure at certain tender touches", but were nevertheless not sufficiently aroused during coitus. Bonaparte examined the distance between the clitoris and the vagina in 200 women. In 69% of the women, the CUMD was 1.25 to 2.25 cm, most of whom experienced the sexual act as satisfying. In 10% of the women, the CUMD was 2.5 cm, 21% measured 2.75 to 3.5 cm. All the women with a large gap stated that they did not experience satisfying pleasure from penile penetration, although some were very sensitive to "precise stroking by the man".
Bonaparte concluded from this an anatomical causal connection between a large CUMD and "vaginal frigidity" explaining why only women with the clitoral glans close to the vagina (so that it is continuously touched by the penis) were able to experience "the highest sexual pleasure" during coitus.

A study by Carney Landis and colleagues in 1940 includes statements to this effect: "On the physical side orgasm capacity is related to clitoris-meatus distance." (Landis et al. 1940).

In 2011, Kim Wallen and Elisabeth Lloyd reviewed Bonaparte's research and confirmed an inverse correlation between CUMD and orgasm through intercourse.
In methods taught since the 1970s by Betty Dodson, the sexual arousal of the woman during vaginal intercourse is to be ensured by the woman independently stimulating her vulva and clitoris continuously with her hands or possibly with a vibrator. According to Kim Wallen, the CUMD says nothing about a happy sex life, rather that a large gap gives couples an opportunity "to be a bit more inventive in how they have sex."

Clinical significance

Irritation
Irritation and itching of the vulva is called pruritus vulvae. This can be a symptom of many disorders, some of which may be determined by a patch test. The most common cause of irritation is thrush, a fungal infection. Vulvovaginal health measures can help to prevent many disorders including thrush. Infections of the vagina such as vaginosis and of the uterus may produce vaginal discharge which can be an irritant when it comes into contact with the vulvar tissue. Inflammation as vaginitis, and vulvovaginitis can result from this causing irritation and pain. Ingrown hairs resulting from pubic hair shaving can cause folliculitis where the hair follicle becomes infected; or give rise to an inflammatory response known as pseudofolliculitis pubis. A less common cause of irritation is genital lichen planus, another inflammatory disorder. A severe variant of this is vulvovaginal-gingival syndrome which can lead to narrowing of the vagina, or vulva destruction. Many types of infection and other diseases including some cancers may cause irritation.

Sexually transmitted infections

Vulvar organs and tissues can become affected by different infectious agents such as bacteria and viruses, or infested by parasites such as lice and mites. Over thirty types of pathogen can be sexually transmitted, and many of these affect the genitals. Most STIs do not produce symptoms or symptoms may be mild and not be indicative of an STI. The practice of safe sex can greatly reduce the risk of infection from many sexually transmitted pathogens. The use of condoms (either male or female condoms) is one of the most effective methods of protection.

Bacterial infections include: chancroid – characterised by genital ulcers known as chancres; granuloma inguinale showing as inflammatory granulomas often described as nodules; syphilis –the primary stage classically presents with a single chancre, a firm, painless, non-itchy ulcer, but there may be multiple sores; and gonorrhea that very often presents no symptoms but can result in discharge.

Viral infections include human papillomavirus infection (HPV) – this is the most common STI and has many types. Genital HPV can cause genital warts. There have been links made between HPV and vulvar cancer, though HPV most often causes cervical cancer. Genital herpes is mostly asymptomatic but can present with small blisters that break open into ulcers. HIV/AIDS is mostly transmitted through sexual activity, and the vulva in some cases can be affected by sores. 
A highly contagious viral infection is molluscum contagiosum which is transmissible on close contact and causes water warts.

Parasitic infections include trichomoniasis, pediculosis pubis, and scabies. Trichomoniasis is transmitted by a parasitic protozoan and is the most common non-viral STI. Most cases are asymptomatic but may present symptoms of irritation and a discharge of unusual odor. Pediculosis pubis commonly called crabs, is a disease caused by the crab louse an ectoparasite. When the pubic hair is infested the irritation produced can be intense. Scabies, also known as the "seven year itch", is caused by another ectoparasite, the mite Sarcoptes scabiei, giving intense irritation.

Cancer 

Malignancies can develop in the glabrous and hair-bearing parts of the vulva. Based on the cellular origin and histology, vulvar cancers are classified into squamous cell carcinomas, melanomas, basal cell carcinomas, adenocarcinomas, sarcomas and invasive extramammary Paget's disease. Squamous cell carcinomas represent the most common variant of vulvar cancers and account for approximately 75%. These are usually found in the labia particularly the labia majora. The second most common vulvar cancer is basal cell carcinoma, which rarely spreads to regional lymph nodes or distant organs. The third most common subtype is vulvar melanoma. Studies have shown that vulvar melanomas appear to have a different tumor biology and mutational characteristics compared to skin melanomas, which has a direct impact on the medical treatment of vulvar melanomas.

Signs and symptoms of vulvar cancer can include: itching, or bleeding; skin changes including rashes, sores, lumps or ulcers, and changes in vulvar skin coloration. Pelvic pain might also occur especially during urinating and sex. However, a significant proportion remains asymptomatic in early disease stages, often delaying its diagnosis. As such, 32% of women with vulvar melanoma already have regional involvement or distant metastases at the time of diagnosis, which significantly impacts prognosis.

Surgery (with or without removal of regional lymph nodes) is usually the primary treatment modality. Typically, a wide-local excision is performed, in which the tumor is excised including a safety-margin of healthy tissue to ensure its entire removal, which is confirmed by a pathologist. In more advanced disease, a (partial) vulvectomy may need to be performed in order to remove some or all of the vulva. Advanced-stage melanomas can be treated with checkpoint inhibitors.

Other
Labial fusion, also called labial adhesion, is the fusion of the labia minora. This affects a number of young girls and is not considered unduly problematic. The condition can usually be treated using creams, or it may right itself with the release of hormones at the onset of puberty.

Vulvodynia is chronic pain in the vulvar region. There is no single identifiable cause. A subtype of this is vulvar vestibulitis but since this is not thought to be an inflammatory condition it is more usually referred to as vestibulodynia. Vulvar vestibulitis usually affects pre-menopausal women.

A number of skin disorders such as lichen sclerosus, and lichen simplex chronicus can affect the vulva. Crohn's disease of the vulva is an uncommon form of metastatic Crohn's disease which manifests as a skin condition showing as hypertrophic lesions or vulvar abscesses. Papillary hidradenomas are nodules that can ulcerate and are mostly found on the skin of the labia or of the interlabial folds. Another more complex ulcerative condition is hidradenitis suppurativa which is characterised by painful cysts that can ulcerate, and recur, and can become chronic lasting for many years. Chronic cases can develop into squamous cell carcinomas. An asymptomatic skin disorder of the vulval vestibule is vestibular papillomatosis which is characterised by fine, pink projections from either the epithelium of the vulva or from the labia minora. Dermatoscopy can distinguish this condition from genital warts. A subtype of psoriasis, an autoimmune disease, is inverse psoriasis in which red patches can appear in the skin folds of the labia.

Childbirth
The vulvar region is at risk for trauma during childbirth.
During childbirth, the vagina and vulva must stretch to accommodate the baby's head (approximately ). This can result in tears known as perineal tears in the vaginal opening, and other structures within the perineum. An episiotomy (a pre-emptive surgical cutting of the perineum) is sometimes performed to facilitate delivery and limit tearing. A tear takes longer to heal than an incision. Tears and incisions may be repaired using sutures that may be layered. Among the methods of hair removal evaluated for pre-surgeries, pubic hair shaving known as prepping, was seen to increase the risk of surgical site infections. No advantages have been demonstrated in the routine shaving of pubic hair prior to childbirth.

Surgery 

Genitoplasties are plastic surgeries that can be carried out to repair, restore or alter vulvar tissues, particularly following damage caused by injury or cancer treatment. These procedures include vaginoplasty which can also be performed as a cosmetic surgery. Other cosmetic surgeries to change the appearance of external structures include labiaplasties. Some of these procedures, vaginoplasties and labiaplasties, are also carried out as sex reassignment surgeries.

The use of cosmetic surgeries has been criticized by clinicians. The American College of Obstetricians and Gynecologists recommends that women be informed of the risks of these surgeries. They refer to the lack of data relevant to their safety and effectiveness and to the potential associated risks such as infection, altered sensation, dyspareunia, adhesions, and scarring. There is also a percentage of people seeking cosmetic surgery who may be suffering from body dysmorphic disorder and surgery in these cases can be counterproductive.

Society and culture

Altering the female genitalia

In some cultural practices, particularly in the African Khoikhoi and Rwanda cultures, the labia minora are purposefully stretched by repeated pulling on them and sometimes by attaching weights. Labia stretching is a recognised, familial cultural practice in parts of Eastern and Southern Africa. This is a desired and encouraged practice by the women (starting at puberty) in order to promote better sexual satisfaction for both parties. The achieved extensions can hang down below the labia majora for up to seven inches. Children in the African diaspora practise this too, so it occurs within immigrant communities in, for example, Britain, where a BBC report labelled it a hidden form of child abuse The girls are subject to familial and social pressure to conform.

In some cultures, including modern Western culture, women have shaved or otherwise removed the hair from part or all of the vulva. When high-cut swimsuits became fashionable, women who wished to wear them would remove the hair on either side of their pubic triangles, to avoid exhibiting pubic hair. Other women prefer to retain their vulva hair. The removal of hair from the vulva is a fairly recent phenomenon in the United States, Canada, and Western Europe, usually in the form of bikini waxing or Brazilian waxing, but has been prevalent in many Eastern European and Middle Eastern cultures for centuries, usually due to the idea that it may be more hygienic, or originating in prostitution and pornography. Hair removal may include all, most, or some of the hair. French waxing leaves a small amount of hair on either side of the labia or a strip directly above and in line with the pudendal cleft called a landing strip. Islam teaching includes Muslim hygienical jurisprudence a practice of which is the removal of pubic hair.

Several forms of genital piercings can be made in the vulva, and include the Christina piercing, the Nefertiti piercing, the fourchette piercing, and labia piercings. Piercings are usually performed for aesthetic purposes, but some forms like the clitoral hood piercing might also enhance pleasure during sex. Though they are common in traditional cultures, intimate piercings are a fairly recent trend in Western society. Other forms of permanent modifications of the vulva for cultural, decorative or aesthetic reasons are genital tattoos or scarification (so-called "hanabira").

Female genital surgery includes laser resurfacing of the labia to remove wrinkles, labiaplasty (reducing the size of the labia) and vaginoplasty. In September 2007, the American College of Obstetricians and Gynecologists (ACOG) issued a committee opinion on these and other female genital surgeries, including "vaginal rejuvenation", "designer vaginoplasty", "revirgination", and "G-spot amplification". This opinion states that the safety of these procedures has not been documented. The ACOG and the ISSVD recommend that women seeking these surgeries need to be informed about the lack of data supporting these procedures and the potential associated risks such as infection, altered sensation, dyspareunia, adhesions, and scarring.

With the growing popularity of female cosmetic genital surgeries, the practice increasingly draws criticism from an opposition movement of cyberfeminist activist groups and platforms, called the labia pride movement. The major point of contention is that heavy advertising for these procedures, in combination with a lack of public education, fosters body insecurities in women with larger labia in spite of the fact that there is normal and pronounced individual variation in the size of labia. The preference for smaller labia is a matter of a fashion fad and is without clinical or functional significance.
	
The most prevalent form of non-consensual genital alteration is that of female genital mutilation. This mostly involves the partial or complete removal of genital organs. Female genital mutilation is carried out in thirty countries in Africa and Asia with more than 200 million girls being affected, and some women (as of 2018). Nearly all of the procedures are carried out on young girls. The practices are also carried out globally among migrants from these areas. Female genital mutilation is claimed to be mostly carried out for cultural traditional reasons.

Etymology

The word vulva is Latin for "womb". It derives from the 1540s in referring to the womb and female sexual organs, from the earlier volvere meaning to turn, roll or revolve, with further derivatives such as used in volvox, and volvulus (twisted bowel). The naming influenced the general perception of the vulva and this is shown in depicted gynaecological procedures. The examiner shown in the Obstetrical examination dated 1822, is adopting the compromise procedure where the woman's genitals cannot be seen.

Terminology
In 2021, a study in the UK showed that few are able to label the structure of the vulva correctly.

There are many sexual slang terms used for the vulva. Cunt, a medieval word for the vulva and once the standard term, has become a vulgarism, and in other uses one of the strongest offensive and abusive swearwords in English-speaking cultures. The word has been replaced in normal usage by a few euphemisms including pussy (vulgar slang) and fanny (UK) which used to be a common pet name. In the UK these terms have other non-sexual meanings that lend themselves to double entendres, such as pussy which is used as a term of endearment for a pet cat – pussy cat. In North American informal use the term pussy can also refer to a weak or effeminate man, and fanny is a term used for the buttocks. Other slang terms are muff, snatch, twat, and crotch. Vagina is often used as a synonym for vulva even though it is a separate part of the anatomy.

Religion and art

Some cultures have long celebrated and even worshipped the vulva. During the Uruk period ( 4000–3100 BC), the ancient Sumerians regarded the vulva as sacred and a vast number of Sumerian poems praising the vulva of Inanna, the goddess of love, sex, and fertility, have survived. In Sumerian religion, the goddess Nin-imma is the divine personification of female genitalia. Vaginal fluid is always described in Sumerian texts as tasting "sweet" and, in a Sumerian bridal hymn, a young maiden rejoices that her vulva has grown hair. Clay models of vulvas were discovered in the temple of Inanna at Ashur.

Some major Hindu traditions such as Shaktism, a goddess-centred tradition, revere the vulva and vagina under the name yoni. The goddess as Devi is worshipped as the supreme deity. The yoni is a representation of the female deity and is found in many temples as a focus for prayer and offerings. It is also represented symbolically as a mudra in spiritual practices, including yoga.

Sheela na gigs are figurative carvings of naked women displaying an exaggerated vulva. They are found in ancient and medieval European contexts. They are displayed on many churches, but their origin and significance is debatable. A main line of thinking is that they were used to ward off evil spirits. Another view is that the sheela na gig was a divine assistant in childbirth. Starr Goode explores the image and possible meanings of the Sheela na gig and Baubo images in particular, but writes also about the recurring image worldwide. Through hundreds of photographs, she demonstrates that the image of a female displaying her vulva is not specific to European religious art or architecture, but that similar images are found in the visual arts and in mythical narratives of goddesses and heroines parting their thighs to reveal what she calls, "sacred powers." Her theory is that "the image is so rooted in our psyches that it seems as if the icon is the original cosmological center of the human imagination."

 ("Origin of the world") painted by Gustave Courbet in 1866 was an early Realist painting of a vulva that only became exhibited many years later. The painting was commissioned by Ottoman diplomat Halil Şerif Paşa. The woman used as the model for the painting was probably Halil's lover Constance Quéniaux. However another potential model is Marie-Anne Detourbay, who was also a lover of Halil Şerif Pasha.

Japanese sculptor and manga artist Megumi Igarashi has focused much of her work on painting and modelling vulvas and vulva-themed works. She has used molds to create dioramas – three-dimensional models of her vulva with the hope of demystifying the female genitals.

An art installation called The Dinner Party by feminist artist, Judy Chicago, portrays a symbolic history of famous women. The dinner plates each depict an elaborate vulval form and they are arranged in a triangular vulva shape. Another installation was made by British artist Jamie McCartney who used the casts of four hundred vulvas to create The Great Wall of Vagina in 2011. The vagina casts are life-size. Explanations written by the project's sexual health adviser accompany these. The purpose of the artist was to "address some of the stigmas and misconceptions that are commonplace".

Additional images

References

External links 

'V' is for vulva, not just vagina by Harriet Lerner discussing common misuse of the word "vagina"
Vulvar hygiene and Urinary Tract Infections by Heather Corinna (illustrations; no explicit photos)

 
Mammal female reproductive system
Human female reproductive system
Pelvis